Jordi Mareñá Gumbau (born 17 May 1991 in Villarreal, Castellón, Valencian Community) is a Spanish professional footballer who plays for UP Langreo as a midfielder.

External links

1991 births
Living people
People from Villarreal
Sportspeople from the Province of Castellón
Spanish footballers
Footballers from the Valencian Community
Association football midfielders
Segunda División players
Segunda División B players
Tercera División players
CD Castellón footballers
CD Olímpic de Xàtiva footballers
Écija Balompié players
Atlético Saguntino players
UP Langreo footballers